Agyneta floridana is a species of sheet weaver found in the United States. It was described by Banks in 1896.

References

floridana
Spiders of the United States
Spiders described in 1896
Taxa named by Nathan Banks